George Andrew Reisner Jr. (November 5, 1867 – June 6, 1942) was an American archaeologist of Ancient Egypt, Nubia and Palestine.

Biography
Reisner was born in Indianapolis, Indiana. His parents were George Andrew Reisner I and Mary Elizabeth Mason. His father's parents were of German descent. Reisner gained B.A., M.A. and Ph.D. degrees from Harvard University, before becoming a travelling fellow. 

He married Mary Putnam Bronson, with whom he had a daughter, also called Mary.

In 1889, Reisner was head football coach at Purdue University, coaching for one season and compiling a record of 2–1.

Archaeology career
Upon his studies at Jebel Barkal (The Holy Mountain), in Nubia he found the Nubian kings were not buried in the pyramids but outside of them. He also found the skull of a Nubian female (who he thought was a king) which is in the collection of the Peabody Museum of Archaeology and Ethnology at Harvard. Reisner believed that Kerma was originally the base of an Egyptian governor and that these Egyptian rulers evolved into the independent monarchs of Kerma.

He also created a list of Egyptian viceroys of Kush.  He found the tomb of Queen Hetepheres I, the mother of King Khufu (Cheops in Greek) who built the Great Pyramid at Giza. During this time he also explored mastabas. Arthur Merton (London Times) remarked in 1936 in the aftermath of the Abuwtiyuw discovery that Reisner "enjoys an unrivalled position not only as the outstanding figure in present-day Egyptology, but also as a man whose soundness of judgement and extensive general knowledge are widely conceded."

In 1902 permission to excavate the Western cemetery in Giza was granted by Gaston Maspero, director of the Egyptian Antiquities Service. The area was divided into three sections, and chosen by lot. The 1902-1905 excavations were financed by Phoebe Apperson Hearst. The southern section was given to the Italians under Ernesto Schiaparelli, the northern strip to the Germans under Ludwig Borchardt, and the middle section to Andrew Reisner.
He met Queen Marie of Romania in Giza.

In Egypt, Reisner developed a new archaeological technique which became a standard in the profession, combining the British methods of Petrie, the German methods of Dorpfeld and Koldewey, his own American practicality and his skill for large-scale organization. Despite later being recognised as a mark of good practice, this technique was at the time controversial, and was criticised as being overly elaborate.

In 1908, after a decade in Egypt, Reisner headed the Harvard excavation of Samaria.

In 1913 Reisner was tasked with training the young archaeologist O.G.S. Crawford in excavation techniques, Crawford was later to warmly recall that Reisner was "an excavator of the first rank".

Timeline
 1897–1899: Classified Egyptology collection of the Egyptian Museum in Cairo
 1899–1905: Led the Hearst Expedition of the University of California to explore burial grounds at and around Qift
 1905: Edited The Hearst Medical Papyrus
 1905–1914: Assistant professor of Egyptology at Harvard University
 1907–1909: Directed archaeological survey of Nubia (Nilotic Sudan) for Egyptian government
 1910–1942: Curator of Egyptian collections at the Boston Museum of Fine Arts
 1914–1942: Professor of Egyptology at Harvard University
 1916: Discovers in Jebel Barkal, in two separate caches, hard stone statues, representing Taharqa and four of his five successors: Tanwetamani, Senkamanisken, Anlamani, and Aspelta
 1916–1923: Explored pyramids of Meroë, dug out temple at Napata
 1931: Wrote Mycerinus (alternative name of Menkaure)
 1942: Published final work, A History of the Giza Necropolis

Published works
  (reprint )
 
 
  (reprint )
  (with Clarence Stanley Fisher and David Gordon Lyon)
 
 
 
  (completed by Mohammad Hassan Abd-ul-Rahman)

Head coaching record

References

Further reading
 Reisner Biography
 "Reisner, George Andrew." Encyclopædia Britannica. 2005. Encyclopædia Britannica Online. 11 Nov. 2005 <http://search.eb.com/eb/article-9063116>.

External links
 
 
 

1867 births
1942 deaths
American Egyptologists
Harvard University alumni
Harvard University faculty
Purdue Boilermakers football coaches
People from Indianapolis
American people of German descent